The Ölschnitz is right-bank, southeastern headstream of the Red Main in the German province of Upper Franconia in Bavaria.

Course 
The Ölschnitz starts at the confluence of the Laimbach and Bieberswöhrbach streams near Emtmannsberg-Unterölschnitz and discharges into the Red Main near Weidenberg-Neunkirchen.

Places 
The Ölschnitz flows through the following places:
 Unterölschnitz
 Hauendorf
 Lehen
 Stockau
 Neunkirchen

Tributaries 
 Oberölschnitzer Bach (left)
 Lainbach (right)
 Würgersbach (right)
 Mühlbach (right)

See also 
List of rivers of Bavaria

References

External links 
 Gauge in Gampelmühle 

Rivers of Bavaria
Bayreuth (district)
Rivers of Germany